Anthrenus sarnicus, the Guernsey carpet beetle, is a type of carpet beetle ('Sarnia' is the Latin name for Guernsey). It can be generally found in Great Britain. Its suborder is Polyphaga, the infraorder is Bostrichiformia, the superfamily is Bostrichoidea, and the family is Dermestidae. The carpet beetle is shaped like an oval and about the size of a pin.

Description

Diet
Carpet beetles are known for eating away at carpets and rugs. Their diet  consists of feathers, furs, insects, dead animals, processed human food, skins, cotton, silk, and wool.

Predators
A variety of predators like ants and spiders will feed on carpet beetle larvae. No predators will exclusively eat carpet beetles and the larvae will hide in dark places to avoid them.

Life Cycle
All carpet beetles will go through metamorphism during their lives. They will pass through the egg, larval, and pupal points to reach full maturity. This can take two months to many years. Four generations of carpet beetles can develop every year. It can take 9 months to 2 years for a carpet beetle to become a full adult. However, adults only survive for a couple of weeks. The adults are skillful fliers and can live for many weeks without food. In the UK, it was found that between June and September, the beetles mostly stay outdoors, migrating indoors during the rest of the year.

As a pest
Signs of an infestation are spotting their pellets and skin. One should also expect to see the adult beetles and their larvae. Adult guernsey carpet beetles have patches of brown, white, and  black. They move slowly and when touched they will roll over. The source of the infestations can be identified by looking for where there are more beetles, skins, and feces.

Outdoor Treatment
First of all get rid of all nests and hives in your backyard. Those are great places for beetles to nest which you do not want. Then, spray liquid insecticide around the perimeter of your house. Make sure so wear proper clothing at all times before you do this.

Indoor Treatment 
Vacuum your whole entire house especially where you think the infestation is. Throw away any items that are already infested. Wash all your clothing and fabrics with soap and hot water. If you want, you can go the extra length by steam cleaning your furniture and carpentry.

Prevention
Close your screen less doors and windows at all times to prevent the beetles from entering your house. Inspect all plants and flowers before they enter your house. Store unused clothing in airtight containers and let your clothing get some sunlight every day.

References

 
 

sarnicus